

Awards and emblems of the Ministry of Defence of the Russian Federation

Awards of the Ministry of Internal Affairs of Russia

Awards of the Ministry for Emergency Situations of Russia

Ministry of Justice

Federal Registration Service

Ministry of Transport

Medals

Badges

Safety Office of the Ministry of Transport of the Russian Federation

Medals

Badges

Federal Agency for Physical Culture and Sport
This Federal Agency was absorbed into The Ministry of Sport, Tourism and Youth Policy of the Russian Federation on 7 October 2008.

Ministry of Digital Development, Communications and Mass Media

Security Services of the Ministry of the Russian Federation for Communications and Information

Medals

Badges

Ministry of Industry and Trade

Ministry of Energy

Ministry of Health and Social Development

Ministry of Agriculture

Ministry of Natural Resources and Ecology

Ministry of Culture

Ministry of Regional Development

Commission For Human Rights Of The Russian Federation

See also
List of orders, decorations, and medals of the Russian Federation
List of awards of independent services of the Russian Federation
Honorary titles of the Russian Federation
Awards and decorations of the Soviet Union

External links
The Ministry of Emergency Situations (EMERCOM) of Russia
The Ministry of Defence of the Russian Federation
The Ministry of Internal Affairs of the Russian Federation
The Federal Security Service of the Russian Federation
The Federal Protective Service of the Russian Federation
The Foreign Intelligence Service of the Russian Federation
The Federal Agency for Government Communication and Information of the Russian Federation
The Federal Customs Service of Russia
The State Courier Service of the Russian Federation
The Federal Immigration Service of the Russian Federation
The Justice Ministry of the Russian Federation
Internet Portal – Russian Symbols

References

Orders, decorations, and medals of Russia
Russia